The EMD 1010 or EMD 265 is a line of four-stroke diesel engines manufactured by Electro-Motive Diesel.  The precursor to the 1010 was introduced around 1998 as the 265H or H-Engine. The H-engine was initially designed for use as a  16 cylinder, the EMD SD90MAC; however, the early engines were found to be explosive, and unsuccessful in the market, with the proven EMD 710 2-stroke  design being preferred.  The EMD four-stroke engine was resurrected in 2015 to meet EPA Tier 4 emissions regulations.

History

H-Engine
Development of the H-engine was announced in 1994 as a railway locomotive specific engine - the design was influenced by the transition to AC traction motors, which had increased adhesion and tractive effort characteristics, allowing an increase in usable power to be usefully converted traction - thus the new design was to have  available for traction - a 6000 hp locomotive design would allow one to replace two of the very common 3000 hp SD40-2 locomotives.

Instead of a development of its two stroke design EMD chose to develop a new four stroke engine, with potential for reduced emissions being one factor in favor of the change of design. EMD had investigated the potential of four-stroke designs in 1984, building two prototype  16 cylinder 854H engines (with 854 cu.in. displacement per cylinder). However, EMD soon realized that to reach the 6000 hp goal, the prototypes were not enough. Therefore, the plan to use the 854H as the basis was abandoned and EMD decided to build a new design of engine with a larger displacement per cylinder, later named as the EMD 265H. 

The new engine was designed using modern techniques, including 3D modelling, finite element analysis, computational fluid dynamics, and other simulations, as well as using real world fatigue and other testing. The initial locomotive designed to use the H-engine was the SD90MAC. The crankcase design switched to ductile cast iron from welded steel (in the 2 stroke series); like the 2-stroke designs the new engine incorporated unitized power assemblies. The V connecting rods switched from fork and blade to side by side and electronic fuel injection replaced mechanical fuel injection. Each engine incorporated two turbochargers, one per cylinder bank. Eight engines were produced and tested at the Transportation Technology Center under the management of the Association of American Railroads in Pueblo, Colorado.

Union Pacific began using some H-engined SD90MAC locomotives in commercial service in 1998.

Initial orders for the 265H engine powered locomotives were delivered powered by 4300 hp EMD 710 engines (referred to as SD9043MAC), intended to be converted to the 4 stroke design later once the engine's teething troubles were resolved. Canadian Pacific, Union Pacific and lessor CIT Group acquired this locomotive type. Only CP and UP operated H-engine powered units (SD90MAC-H). UP's fleet was returned to EMD after the lease expired. Considered unsuccessful in the domestic market due to reliability issues and limited operational flexibility of the 6000 horsepower engine, all 265H-powered versions in North America and Australia have been retrofitted with 4300 horsepower 16V710G engines or scrapped.

EMD also built one SD89MAC demonstrator, EMDX 92, as the less powerful version of the SD90MAC. It used a V12 version of the 265H engine (12-265H) generating 4500 hp. Initially the SD89MAC was intended to be the successor of the EMD SD70 Series. However, none were ordered.

The 265H engine was also used overseas: in 2005 an order for 300  Tier 2 engines was received from the Chinese Railways, with final assembly at the Dalian Locomotive Factory, introduced from 2009 as "Harmony" HXN3 class. Orders were also received from India and Australian mining railroads. Tidewater Marine acquired twenty 16 cylinder engines for marine use in tugboats in 2002.

The 16-265H remains the most powerful diesel engine ever produced by EMD.

J-Engine
To meet EPA Tier 4 emission standards for nitrogen oxides (NOx), manufacturers rely on one of two methods: exhaust gas recirculation (EGR), where exhaust gases are cooled and recirculated back through the combustion cycle, or selective catalytic reduction (SCR) using urea-based diesel exhaust fluid, which converts NOx in the catalytic converter to elemental nitrogen and water. Although EGR requires a diesel particulate filter, it is the preferred solution for Class I operators, as SCR adds another consumable with handling and storage issues by maintenance personnel.

The four-stroke engine design was re-introduced in the mid 2010s to meet Tier 4 without using SCR. Although EMD had experimented with modifying the 710 to meet Tier 4, the prototype proved to be too heavy and inefficient to be practical. Testing of the new locomotives began in the Spring of 2016. The first two units of a 65 unit order for the new locomotive were delivered to Union Pacific in December 2016.

The block designation was changed to J to reflect the changes to the new engine, which included power assembly and block redesigns, as well as the addition of a two-stage turbocharging system consisting of three turbochargers. Other new features are an EGR system to reduce exhaust emissions and double-walled fuel injection to increase safety.

Versions

See also
EMD 567, EMD 645, EMD 710 - previous 2-stroke engines by EMD

Notes

References

External links
 
 
 

Diesel locomotive engines
Diesel engines